Betty Jean Grant is an American politician from Buffalo, New York. She served as an Erie County Legislator from 2007 until 2017, representing the 2nd district, after previously serving the 7th district.

Grant was born and raised in Brighton, Tennessee, a small rural town approximately 18 miles from Memphis. She attended Medaille College, where she earned a Bachelor of Science degree in Elementary Education, graduating Magna Cum Laude in 1993. She earned a Master of Science degree in Special Education from Buffalo State College. She has also owned a deli and worked as a school teacher.

Grant was elected to the Buffalo Common Council in 1999 representing the University District. She served two full terms on the Common Council. As a council member, she pushed to clean up a toxic waste site and created three Economic Empowerment Zones that drew new businesses to areas on Bailey Avenue, Kensington Avenue and Main Street.

In 2004, Betty Jean Grant was elected to the Buffalo Public School Board of Education, representing the Ferry District. She was elected to the Erie County Legislature in 2007 and was re-elected in 2009, 2011, 2013 and 2015. In 2012, she began serving as Chair of the Erie County Legislature after both her Democratic and Republican colleagues unanimously voted for her.

Grant lost by only 139 votes to Tim Kennedy in the Democratic Primary for New York State Senate District 63 in 2012. She challenged him again in 2014 in a race that drew much attention because of the dollar amounts involved, but lost again. Grant also ran in the primary for the mayor of Buffalo in 2017, making the point that there was a need for greater city investment in the East Side.

Grant served on the legislature until 2017 when she retired from public service, and April Baskin was elected that year to fill her seat.

Though no longer an elected official, she remains an active community organizer through the We Are Women Warriors empowerment group and is a frequent radio guest on WUFO.

In 2018, she received the Western New York Peace Center's Lifetime Achievement Award at its 51st Annual Dinner. That same year she also received the Woman of Courage, Compassion and Commitment Award during the Buffalo & Erie County Public Library's kickoff event for Women's History Month.

Legislator Grant worked at the Erie County Board of Elections after her time in the Legislature.

References

Living people
County legislators in New York (state)
New York (state) Democrats
Politicians from Buffalo, New York
Year of birth missing (living people)